Petr Nerad (born 6 February 1994) is a Czech professional footballer who currently plays for SK Hvozdnice.

Career
In 2011, during his time at Bohemians 1905, Nerad was named "Goalkeeper of the Tournament" in the inaugrial CEE Cup.

SK Hvozdnice
In the summer 2019, Nerad joined SK Hvozdnice.

References

External links
 
 

1994 births
Living people
Czech footballers
Czech Republic youth international footballers
Czech Republic under-21 international footballers
Association football midfielders
Czech First League players
Czech National Football League players
Bohemians 1905 players
FC Vysočina Jihlava players
FC Baník Ostrava players
FC Silon Táborsko players